The Ho-Am Prize (호암상, 湖岩賞, literally lake and rock award) is a Korean annual award presented to "domestic/abroad ethnic Korean who have made outstanding contributions to the development of science and culture and enhancement of the welfare of mankind". Starting in 1991, it is funded by Samsung and named after their former chairman, Lee Byung-chul (Ho-Am is his pen name which means filling up a space with clear water as lakes do, and being unshakable as a large rock). The award consists of a 6 oz gold medal, a laureate diploma, and 300 million Korean won (approximately $265,000 US dollars).

The prize is currently awarded in five fields:
 Ho-Am Prize in Science
 Ho-Am Prize in Engineering
 Ho-Am Prize in Medicine
 Ho-Am Prize in the Arts
 Ho-Am Prize in Community Service

In addition, a Ho-Am Prize in Mass Communication was awarded from 1991 to 1996, but has now been replaced by a Special Prize.

See also
 List of general science and technology awards
 List of awards named after people

References

External links
Ho-Am Prize official site
Ho-Am Prize winners

Science and technology in South Korea
South Korean awards
Samsung
Annual events in South Korea